Westwon was a dance/rock fusion band formed in 1987 and who supported Gary Numan on the 1987 Exhibition Tour.

Marc Heal took over as vocalist following the departure of original front-man Bill Colbourne, after the recording of a self-titled CD that was released by Canadian label Brouhaha in 1988. The line up in early 1990 was Marc Heal on vocals, Si Rapley on guitar, Graham Rayner on keyboards, and Mick Caddick on drums.

In June 1990, Westwon signed to UK metal label Music for Nations on the FAA imprint, releasing two singles: "National Radio" (1991) and "Control" (1992). The dance remixes of "Control" were  fair sized club hit. By the time of the single releases, the band became a two-piece with only Heal and Rapley remaining. A second album was recorded but never released.

Westwon disbanded in 1992 and Heal went on to form Cubanate with Graham Rayner.

Demo Chart interview, 1990
Demo Chart magazine was a short-lived title that promoted unsigned UK acts. An interview with Heal appeared in the May 1990 edition when Westwon reached number one in the magazine's chart.

The Canadian label that Heal refers to, Brouhaha, called the interview "both fascinating and one-eyed". The Head of A&R for the label at the time claimed "the facts are that the label spent in excess of £70,000 recording and mixing, but Westwon refused to promote the first, eponymous album by insisting on a complete remix which would have cost an additional £25,000. Brouhaha, quite rightly, refused to do so, and this was the reason for the fallout. No management dispute, simply a change of the goalposts once the game has started, given that the band were involved in the creative process from day one. I believe the original album is an unreleased classic, and the label still retains ownership of the master tapes".
Song lineup (1990)
"National Radio"
"Control"
"Sleeping Beauty"
"All Tomorrow's Parties"
"Halloween"
"Love You to Death"

Discography

Album
Westwon (1988) (Brouhaha CDCUE10)
"Arena"
"Julia"
"Violence"
"Berlin"
"Decadence" (1)
"Dead Model"
"North American Girl"
"Blue"
"England"
"Cover Girl"
"Love You to Death"
"Decadence" (2)
"Julia" (Extended)
"Arena" (Extended)

Singles
1991: "National Radio"
1992: "Control"

See also
Cubanate
C-Tec
Pigface

References

Musical groups established in 1987
British dance music groups
British rock music groups
Musical groups disestablished in 1992